Frederick Augustus Coe (April 14, 1838 – December 5, 1929) was a cashier in a local iron works in Kingswinford, Staffordshire, England, though later became an iron works manager. Frederick's wife Margaret Robertson (December 16, 1839-December 31, 1924) was a native of Edinburgh, Scotland. The family lived in Cardiff, Wales, by 1874. At the beginning of the 1880s the family were residents in Gloucester. 

Margaret Coe and other members of the Coe family arrived in New York on August 18, 1883, from Hull, England, aboard the Rhodora, a merchant ship owned by Margaret's elder brother George Robertson. Their final destination was Philadelphia. 

Names of the ten surviving children and estimated date of birth from the ship register follows:
 Alice Jane Coe (born about 1863)
 Robert Stanley Coe (born about 1867)
 William Robertson Coe (June 8, 1869-March 15, 1955)
 George Vernon Coe (born about 1871)
 Jno Beresford Coe (born about 1872)
 Margaret F. Coe (born about 1876)
 Verner C. Coe (born about 1879)

After a rough crossing, the Coe family settled in Cinnaminson, New Jersey, east of Philadelphia.

References

People from Kingswinford
1838 births
1929 deaths